Dauntless: The Battle of Midway (a.k.a. Adrift as the working title) is a 2019 action film based on a true story of United States Navy aviators at the Battle of Midway. The theme of the film combines war and aviation film genres. The film was written, directed and produced by Mike Phillips. The screenplay of Dauntless: The Battle of Midway was written by Adam Klein and based on an original story by Phillips.

Plot
By June 1942, the Imperial Japanese Navy has met with spectacular success at the attack on Pearl Harbor and has swept across the Pacific, conquering vast areas. In an effort to change the course of the war, a United States Navy carrier group is positioned off the coast of Midway Atoll, the home of Naval Air Facility Midway Island. The task force plans on springing a trap on the enemy, and the ensuing Battle of Midway turns out to be a pivotal turning point of the Pacific war.

During the battle, a two-man Douglas SBD Dauntless dive bomber crew consisting of pilot Ensign Norman Vandivier (Jade Willey) and S1 (Radioman) Lee Keaney (John Enick) from the USS Enterprise aircraft carrier are in the first wave of dive bombers attacking and sinking a Japanese carrier. In their attempt to escape, their aircraft is struck by enemy fire from a Japanese surface ship. Losing fuel and forced to ditch, the crew look towards their comrades for rescue.

The "misfit" crew of a Consolidated PBY Catalina led by Lieutenant Bennett (Adam Peltier) are sent to search for survivors of the battle, including the downed Dauntless crew of Vandivier and Keaney. While the human drama on the ocean continues, Rear Admiral R.A. Spruance (Judd Nelson) confers with his top officers in planning for the second day of the battle, knowing that his aircraft must again attack a superior foe.

At the conclusion of the battle, the attacking US Navy aircraft are running low on fuel and desperate to find their carriers in the dark. Despite the opposition from his operations officer, Captain Jim Browning (C. Thomas Howell), Spruance orders all lights on the carrier Task Force 16 to be turned on, helping some of his aircraft to limp home.

Amid the vast Pacific with days passing and the chance of rescue fading, the two men in the ocean are forced to face their own mortality. At the end of the second day of the battle, Keaney finally succumbs to his injuries and hypothermia; Vandivier reluctantly pushes his crewmate away but ultimately Vandivier also succumbs to exposure. 

When the Catalina flying boat takes up station again, Lieutenant Bennett and his crew locate a survivor in the water. After one of the crew swims out to bring the obviously exhausted Ensign Ramsay (Chris Roark) to the Catalina, Bennett is, however, distraught that he was unable to rescue his friend, Vandivier.

Cast
 Jade Willey as Ensign Norman Francis Vandivier
 John Enick as S1 Lee Keaney 
 Judd Nelson as Rear Admiral Raymond A. Spruance
 C. Thomas Howell as Captain Jim Browning
 Byrne Offutt as Captain Murray
 Adam Peltier as Lieutenant Bennett
 Drew Garrett as Lieutenant Commander Wade McClusky Jr.
 James Austin Kerr as Banks
 Will Ropp as Mansfield
 Mendel Fogelman as Doc
 Nate Slaughter as Steward
 Paul Kennedy Jr. as Jackson
 Chris Roark as Ensign Thomas Wesley Ramsay
 Jack Malykin as Gallaher
 Miles Tagtmeyer as Allison
 Daniel Mckinley Rhodes as Reynolds
 Demetris Hartman as Ware
 Aidan Bristow as Pags
 Christopher Lee Page as Nussbaum
 Louie Chapman as Smokey
 Jerry Buteyn as BMC Bob Ruch

Production
Dauntless: The Battle of Midway was written primarily by Mike Phillips with the help of Adam Klein who created the screenplay. Phillips had a personal interest in the story of Midway due to a close connection with the family of Ensign Ramsay who fought in the battle. For 15 years, he had worked to adapt the real-life story into a film project.

Douglas SB-2 Dauntless (B-11) from the Bombing Squadron 6 (VB-6) on U.S.S. Enterprise (CV-6) was assigned to pilot Ensign (ENS) Thomas Wesley Ramsay and Aviation Machinist's Mate (AMM2c) Radio-Gunner Sherman Lee Duncan. On June 4, 1942, Ramsay led his squadron of SBDs in the attack on the Japanese aircraft carrier Kaga. Subsequently suffering the same fate as most of his squadron, Ramsay and Duncan were shot down. The two aviators spent eight days in open water before being rescued by a PBY piloted by a former high school classmate of Ramsay's. In April 1943, Ensign Ramsay received the Navy Cross.

Authenticity was ensured by the use of original after-action reports as the screenplay of Adrift (working title) was developed. The reports were written by Lt. Richard Halsey Best, Lt. W. Earl Gallaher, Captain George Murray and Admiral Raymond A. Spruance.

Both Lt. Richard Halsey Best and Lieutenant W. Earl Gallaher launched from USS Enterprise, commanding the SBD Dauntless dive bombers attacks. Captain George Dominic Murray was the commanding officer on the USS Enterprise while Admiral Raymond A. Spruance commanded Task Force 16 at the Battle of Midway, comprising the carriers Enterprise and Hornet.

A brief contemporary account of the Attack on Pearl Harbor was shown in its original black-and-white newsreel-like footage, but the remainder of the film was in color. Due to budget restrictions, heavy reliance on CGI was used for all flight sequences. An effort was evident to accurately depict period military colors, markings with replica military hardware and armament.

Two full-scale models were built, with the main cockpit section of the SBD Dauntless recreated and the interior cockpit and radio station of the PBY Catalina also built as a mock-up.  During location shooting, the ocean scenes were filmed outside Los Angeles as well as in a pool for closeups. Cinematographer Jason Newfield used a variety of ingenious camera platforms mounted on life preservers, dinghy and a yacht to achieve a realistic account of the stranded and drifting Navy crew. Three views of the crewmen in the water were from directly overhead using a drone, at water level and underwater.

Reception

Release
Dauntless: The Battle of Midway did not see wide theatrical release, being mainly distributed through home media and streaming services. A DVD and Blu-ray edition was offered that included additional alternate endings, and two featurettes that documented the making of the film. Worldwide release of the film followed, including editions for Germany, Austria and Switzerland.

Reviews
Dauntless: The Battle of Midway  was largely ignored by critics and has no entries on the review aggregation website Rotten Tomatoes.

Reviewer David Duprey in ‘’ thatmomentin.com’’,  keyed in on the obvious, “… without big studio money behind it, (it) falls well below expectations for your average movie fan used to jaw-dropping, seamless, ultra-realistic imagery. That’s not to say there’s isn’t some genuine effort to make it convincing, because undoubtedly a lot went into doing so …” At least one review by Gary Collinson on flickeringmyth.com noted that the film contained “action-packed” sequences.

The review in navalairhistory.com does provide a sympathetic context for the film, especially after appraising ’’Midway’’, also released in 2019. “The filmmakers’ commitment to authenticity is praiseworthy – indeed, the credits list several after action reports from the time as source material – as is their attention to lesser known aspects of the Midway story. The narrative eschews triumphalism, pulling no punches over the management of the battle which led to a shocking number of aircrews ending up lost, ditched or running out of fuel.”

References

Notes

Citations

Bibliography

 Swanborough Gordon and Peter M. Bowers,. United States Navy Aircraft since 1911. New York: Funk & Wagnalls, 1968. .
 Brazelton, David. The Douglas SBD Dauntless, Aircraft in Profile 196. Leatherhead, Surrey, UK: Profile Publications Ltd., 1967. No ISBN.
 Tillman, Barrett. The Dauntless Dive Bomber of World War II. Annapolis, Maryland, USA: Naval Institute Press, 1976 (softcover 2006). .
 Tillman, Barrett. SBD Dauntless Units of World War 2. Botley, Oxford, UK: Osprey Publishing, 1998. .
 Tillman, Barrett and Robert L. Lawson. U.S. Navy Dive and Torpedo Bombers of World War II. St. Paul, Minnesota, USA: Motor Books Publishing, 2001. .

External links
 

2010s English-language films
2010s war films
2010s historical films
2019 films
2019 independent films
Action films based on actual events
American war films
American epic films
American historical films
American independent films
Films about the Battle of Midway
Films about naval aviation
Films about the United States Navy in World War II
Films set in 1941
Films set in 1942
Films set in Hawaii
Films set in Honolulu
Films set in the Marshall Islands
Films set in the Pacific Ocean
Films set on aircraft
Films set on aircraft carriers
Films set in the United States Minor Outlying Islands
Pacific War films
Pearl Harbor films
War epic films
World War II aviation films
World War II films based on actual events
World War II naval films
2010s survival films
American disaster films
American survival films
Drama films based on actual events
Films about aviation accidents or incidents
American drama films
Films set in the 1940s
Sea adventure films
2019 drama films
2010s American films